Camptostemon is a genus of flowering plants belonging to the family Malvaceae.

Its native range is Central Malesia, Northern Australia.

Species:

Camptostemon aruensis 
Camptostemon philippinensis 
Camptostemon schultzii

References

Malvaceae
Malvaceae genera